The geology of Kosovo includes a variety of different tectonic and stratigraphic features.

Geologic history, stratigraphy and tectonics
Kacanik Flysch
Vrska Cuka granite: An example of Carpatho-Balkan units. Early Paleozoic granites followed by a gap in the Aptian and pelagic clastic rocks from the Cretaceous.
Novo Brdo area: Part of the Central Vardar zone. Situated south of a highly tectonized domain. Novo Brdo schist formed in the Triassic in a volcano-sedimentary basin. 
Brezovica harzburgite

References